Anita P. Barbee is an American psychologist and social worker. She is a Professor & Distinguished University Scholar at the University of Louisville's Kent School of Social Work.

Education
Barbee received her B.A. in English and psychology from Agnes Scott College in 1982. She then enrolled at the University of Georgia, where she received her M.A. and Ph.D. in 1985 and 1988, respectively. Her Ph.D. thesis, entitled The Effects of Positive and Negative Moods on the Cheering Up Process in Close Relationships, received the Dissertation Award from the International Association for Relationship Research (IARR). She received a master's degree in social work from the Kent School of Social Work in 2001.

Career
Originally trained in social psychology, Barbee began working at the Kent School of Social Work in 1993. Her first research conducted there pertained to child welfare evaluations, but since 1996, she has mostly been researching family violence and other risky behaviors.

Academic affiliations
Barbee is the president-elect of the IARR and a fellow of the Society for the Psychological Study of Social Issues. She was inducted as a fellow of the American Academy of Social Work and Social Welfare in 2016. A member of the National Staff Development and Training Association's Executive Council, she received their Lifetime Achievement and President's Service Award in 2007 and 2014, respectively.

References

External links
Faculty page
Profile at Social Psychology Network

American women psychologists
American social psychologists
American social workers
Living people
University of Louisville faculty
Agnes Scott College alumni
University of Georgia alumni
Social workers
Social work scholars
Year of birth missing (living people)
American women academics
21st-century American women